The men's decathlon event at the 2011 Asian Athletics Championships took place on July 7–8, 2011 at the Kobe Universiade Memorial Stadium.

Medalists

Results

100 metres
Wind: –0.8 m/s

Long jump

Shot put

High jump

400 metres

110 metres hurdles
Wind: +0.3 m/s

Discus throw

Pole vault

Javelin throw

1500 metres

Final standings

References
Results

2011 Asian Athletics Championships
Combined events at the Asian Athletics Championships